The Boxing Tournament at the 2007 All-Africa Games was held in Algiers, Algeria from July 11 to July 23. It served as a qualification tournament for the 2008 Summer Olympics in Beijing, PR China. The number one and two earned a ticket for the Olympic tournament.

Medal winners

Medals table

References

External links
Result

Boxing at the African Games
All-Africa Games
2007 All-Africa Games